
Compagnia Nazionale Aeronautica was a manufacturer of aircraft and aircraft engines established in Italy in 1920 by Count Giovanni Bonmartini. Together with a group of World War I veteran pilots, he operated a flying school in Rome from a field that would eventually be developed into Littorio airport. For the next decade or so, CNA also developed their own aircraft and engines to power them. Bonmartini had also worked on an advanced racing motorcycle engine, the GBR in another partnership, and eventually CNA acquired the rights to this as well.

In 1934 Bonmartini sold CNA to Caproni. In turn, Caproni sold rights to the GBR engine to  Gilera, who developed it as the Gilera 500 Rondine.

Aircraft
Types from Italian Civil and Military aircraft 1930-1945
 CNA Beta
 CNA Eta
 CNA Teta
 CNA Merrah
 CNA 15
 CNA 25
 CNA PM.1

Engines
 CNA C
 CNA C.II
 CNA C.VI
 CNA C-7
 CNA D-4

See also

Caproni
Isotta Fraschini
Reggiane

References
 Erickson, Jack. C.N.A. (Italy) in ''Horizontally-Opposed Piston Aero Engines"
 

 
Defunct aircraft manufacturers of Italy
Defunct aircraft engine manufacturers of Italy
Defunct motorcycle manufacturers of Italy
Manufacturing companies established in 1920
Italian companies established in 1920
Defunct motor vehicle manufacturers of Italy
Caproni
Manufacturing companies disestablished in 1934
1934 disestablishments in Italy